Rainville is a commune in the Vosges department in Grand Est in northeastern France.

Inhabitants are called Rainvillois.

Geography
On its south side the commune is bordered by the Vraine, a small river that feeds into the Vair. On the western side it is bordered by the A31 autoroute:  however, there is no direct road access to the autoroute from the village.

See also
Communes of the Vosges department

References

Communes of Vosges (department)